The Futsal Finalissima is a quadrennial futsal competition organised by CONMEBOL and UEFA. The tournament is contested by the top two teams of the South American and European futsal championships for men's national teams, the Copa América de Futsal and UEFA Futsal Championship, respectively. The competition was launched in 2022 as part of a renewed partnership between CONMEBOL and UEFA.

History
On 12 February 2020, UEFA and CONMEBOL signed a renewed memorandum of understanding meant to enhance cooperation between the two organisations. As part of the agreement, a joint UEFA–CONMEBOL committee examined the possibility of staging European–South American intercontinental matches, for both men's and women's football and across various age groups. On 15 December 2021, UEFA and CONMEBOL again signed a renewed memorandum of understanding lasting until 2028, which included specific provisions on opening a joint office in London and the potential organisation of various football events.

On 2 June 2022, the day after staging the 2022 Finalissima, CONMEBOL and UEFA announced a series of new events between teams from the two confederations. This included a tournament between the winners of South America's Copa América de Futsal and the winners of Europe's UEFA Futsal Championship. The first edition took place in Buenos Aires, Argentina, between 15 and 18 September 2022.

Results

Performances

By nation

By confederation

See also
 CONMEBOL–UEFA Cup of Champions

References

External links
 
 

 
International futsal competitions
Futsal
Futsal
Futsal competitions in South America
Futsal competitions in Europe
Recurring sporting events established in 2022
2022 establishments in South America
2022 establishments in Europe